Mexican sage is a common name for several plants and may refer to:

Salvia leucantha, native to central and eastern Mexico
Salvia longistyla
Salvia mexicana, native to Mexico